East Central Alberta Catholic Separate Schools Regional Division No. 16 or East Central Alberta Catholic Schools is a separate school authority within the Canadian province of Alberta operated out of Wainwright.

See also 
List of school authorities in Alberta

References

External links 

 
School districts in Alberta